Laoshan Cola is a brand of cola soft drink produced by Qingdao Beverages Group Co., Ltd. First introduced in 1953, it was the most popular of China's eight major cola brands until it was purchased by the Coca-Cola Company in the 1990s. In 1997, Coca-Cola discontinued the production of Laoshan Cola. Qingdao Laoshan Mineral Water Company purchased the brand in March 2004 and invested in imported machinery to resume production. Laoshan Cola was re-introduced in 2008, but faced with competition from Coca-Cola and Pepsi, never regaining its former market share.

References 

Cola brands
Chinese drinks
1953 establishments in China
Chinese brands
Coca-Cola brands